Geoff(rey) Cook may refer to:

Geoffrey Cooke (cricketer) (1897–1980), English first-class cricketer and British Army officer
Geoff Cook (born 1951), cricketer
Geoff Cook (Australian cricketer) (1910–1982), Australian cricketer
Geoffrey Cook (cricketer, born 1936)
Geoff Cook (rugby league) from List of Parramatta Eels players

See also
Geoff Cooke (disambiguation)
Jeffrey Cook (disambiguation)